Higor Felipe Vidal (born 26 September 1996) is a Brazilian professional footballer who plays as an attacking midfielder or winger.

Career

PAS Giannina
Vidal began his professional career with Greek Super League side PAS Giannina in 2016, having previously played for the youth sides of Paraná and Londrina.He was released on a free transfer on 21 May 2019.

FK Žalgiris
In August 2019 he became a member of lithuanian Žalgiris.

Hapoel Petah Tikva
On 10 August 2020 signed in the Liga Leumit club Hapoel Petah Tikva.

References

External links

1996 births
Living people
People from Paraná (state)
Sportspeople from Paraná (state)
Brazilian expatriate footballers
Brazilian footballers
PAS Giannina F.C. players
FK Žalgiris players
Hapoel Petah Tikva F.C. players
Anagennisi Karditsa F.C. players
Persebaya Surabaya players
Super League Greece players
A Lyga players
Liga Leumit players
Super League Greece 2 players
Liga 1 (Indonesia) players
Expatriate footballers in Greece
Expatriate footballers in Lithuania
Expatriate footballers in Israel
Expatriate footballers in Indonesia
Brazilian expatriate sportspeople in Greece
Brazilian expatriate sportspeople in Lithuania
Brazilian expatriate sportspeople in Israel
Brazilian expatriate sportspeople in Indonesia
Association football midfielders